Lirey is a commune in the Aube department in north-central France.

The Shroud of Turin was found and exposed in the collegiate church created by Geoffroi de Charny in Lirey between about 1355 and 1418, before its transfer to the Château de Montfort (Cote-d'Or), then to Chambéry, then to Turin.

Population

See also
Communes of the Aube department
The Shroud of Turin

References

Communes of Aube
Shroud of Turin
Aube communes articles needing translation from French Wikipedia